Mount Stewart may refer to:

 Mount Stewart, a 19th-century house and garden in Northern Ireland
 Mount Stewart, Prince Edward Island, Canada, a municipality 
 Mount Stewart (California), United States, a mountain in Sequoia National Park
 Mount Stewart, County Tyrone, a townland in County Tyrone, Northern Ireland
 Mount Stewart (townland), a townland in County Down, Northern Ireland
 Mount Charles Stewart, a mountain in the Canadian Rockies
 Mount Stewart (Alberta), a mountain in Alberta, Canada

See also
 Mount Stuart (disambiguation)
 Stewart Peak (disambiguation)